StarStuff was a weekly half-hour space and science program that aired on Australia's Government operated ABC (Australian Broadcasting Corporation).  It was hosted by Stuart Gary who had researched and produced the show since 1998. The final episode was published in December 2015.

History 
After commencing his career as a radio announcer and journalist in commercial radio, Stuart Gary joined the Australian Broadcasting Corporation as a radio news journalist in August 1989. In 1994 Gary was asked by Dr Ian Wolfe to help set up a new radio network for the ABC called PNN which was to provide a continuous news service. After developing station formats and helping to set up the studios, Gary anchored the evening program on the network (which by now had become known as ABC NewsRadio) for 16 years.

When not on air, Gary produced feature stories on a variety of issues for NewsRadio. Features on scientific topics proved to be especially popular with listeners, and eventually NewsRadio Manager Dr Ian Wolfe appointed Gary as NewsRadio Science Editor and commissioned him to provide a specific weekly hour long science news program. Gary named the show StarStuff, taken from Carl Sagan's quote "We are all made of star-stuff" in the first episode of Cosmos, The Shores of the Cosmic Ocean.

StarStuff was designed as an hour-long science news bulletin wrapping up all the past week's developments and advances in science and technology. StarStuff's strict news bulletin format made it unique in Australian science broadcasting. The show was designed as a one-person operation with the presenter Stuart Gary, also sourcing, writing and editing the program on top of his regular evening show, five nights a week. StarStuff's material was sourced from ABC news and current affairs reports, syndicated wires copy, and scientific peer reviewed journals.

The program is written and compiled using iNews. All audio editing is undertaken in Netia and Cool Edit Pro. On line platform material is produced in Site Producer. The program was broadcast on NewsRadio every Sunday night between 1998 and 2010, with a replay the following Saturday evening. Nielsen ratings show StarStuff consistently achieved around 9 percent nationally in the five city metro area market, compared to NewsRadio's average market share of just over 2.5 percent. Star Stuff's success continued when Mark Collier took over from Ian Wolfe as station manager.

However, Collier's decision to leave the ABC in 2010, resulted in the new ABC network manager Margaret Cassidy and NewsRadio station manager Helen Thomas, moving NewsRadio in a different direction with the science genre dropped in favor of strong sports programming. As part of this change StarStuff was axed, despite it being NewsRadio's highest rating program at the time with 9 percent National market share. Either live or featured packages of the show were broadcast weekly on numerous ABC local radio stations. Ironically the decision to axe StarStuff, which always had a strong astronomy and space sciences following, happened in what was the International Year of Astronomy. StarStuff's funding was redirected to a new sport program called Weekend Half Time. Weekend Half Time proved to be unsuccessful, however by then StarStuff had found a new home as a podcast published by ABC Science online.

As part of ABC Science on Line StarStuff averaged over a million downloads a year. The complete StarStuff program was also broadcast in the United States on Science 360 Radio. 

On 1 July 2015 ABC Science on Line was incorporated into the ABC's Radio National network (RN).

In December 2015 Ben Watt from ABC Multi-platform announced the axing of StarStuff claiming the show’s numbers won’t strong enough.

At the time of Watt’s announcement StarStuff was recording 1.3 million downloads annually and had over 500 radio segments per year. It was also the 20th most popular program on the ABC, which commissions thousands of program and features each year.

The show’s creator and host Stuart Gary said "there was clear and indisputable evidence that ABC management were deliberately comparing apples to oranges in what he thought was a pitiful attempt to try and justify their poor decision."

Gary was offered the chance for redeployment within the ABC, but instead resigned to keep StarStuff going as a private venture.

However, the day before he was due to leave, ABC management suddenly demanded that he sign a document preventing him from using the name star stuff on any future astronomy based radio program or podcast he develops, based on the fact that it owned all the intellectual property rights he developed while in their employment.

Gary has since renamed the program to SpaceTime.

SpaceTime follows exactly the same format and maintains the same high standards of accuracy as StarStuff achieved.

The program is now produced as a free twice weekly podcast available through multiple sources including iTunes, Stitcher, Pocketcasts, SoundCloud, Bitesz.com, Audio Boom, and from spacetimewithstuartgary.com

The show is still broadcast coast to coast across the United States on Science 360 Radio, and now achieves higher podcast download numbers than it did as StarStuff when it was part of the ABC. As of July 2017 SpaceTime with Stuart Gary was achieving over 63,000 downloads a week.

Cancellation and relaunch 

In December 2015, Stuart Gary announced via the official StarStuff Twitter account that he had been made redundant by the ABC.  The final StarStuff episode from the government owned broadcaster was released on Wednesday 16 December 2015, where it was revealed that the program's cancellation came in due part of budget cuts.  The show's blog starstuffblog.tumblr.com. was discontinued.  

In December 2015 Ben Watt from ABC Multi-platform announced the axing of StarStuff, claimed the show's numbers were not strong enough.

Format 

Stuart Gary reported on the latest developments with space advancements and sciences.  The show explored developments in astronomy, including astrophysics and cosmology. It also covered news in space sciences such as aerospace and rocket development and the history of human space flight. It regularly informed its listeners about the ongoing progress of various missions such as the Mars rovers, Curiosity, and the Saturn Cassini-Huygens Missions.

Stuart Gary also wrote news and feature articles on astronomy and general science for ABC Science.

Sources
 http://www.smh.com.au/opinion/blogs/sceptic-science/written-in-the-stars-20110330-1cfzw.html

External links
 Official website

ABC News and Current Affairs